The International Sex Worker Foundation for Art, Culture, and Education (ISWFACE) is a California corporation formed as an art and education and resource center for research about prostitution and sex work, and for the collection and preservation of art by and about sex workers.

Information
Its founder and president, Norma Jean Almodovar, is a former LAPD traffic officer, and is also the executive director of COYOTE LA, the Los Angeles chapter of COYOTE. ISWFACE runs the Dumas Brothel Museum in Montana. ISWFACE is a non-profit organization that runs off of donations and sale of the products being created. They want to positively affect the lives of sex workers, and to encourage their artistic work. ISWFACE is a public benefit corporation, organized under the California Non-Profit Public Benefit Corporation Law for public and charitable purposes that is dedicated to offering funding to individuals who have experience with being a sex worker and consider themselves artists.

Works
The organization wants to allow them to create and show their work, such as:
performance art
music
books
documentaries
photos
contributions to cultural heritage of sex workers

Courses
The courses the ICWFACE provides interactive educational courses online that include:
disprove the lies of prostitution
how to exhibit art work
the history of prostitution
AIDS and safe sex
reproductive health and family planning
different countries dealing with prostitution
sex work and the law
communities seeking solutions to public prostitution problems
prostitution in literature
prostitution in film
prostitution and feminism

References

External links
 

Sex worker organizations